Mihai Samuel Haus (born 1 April 1990 in Iaşi, Romania) is a Swedish actor. He is most known for portraying the role of Tsatsiki in the Swedish film Tsatsiki, Morsan och Polisen.

Filmography
1999 - Tsatsiki, morsan och polisen
2001 - Tsatsiki – vänner för alltid
2009 - Glowing Stars (Original title: I taket lyser stjärnorna)
2009 - The Ape (Original title: Apan)
2013 - Orion

References

External links
 

Romanian emigrants to Sweden
Swedish male child actors
Actors from Iași
1990 births
Living people